Frank Windsor Higgins (12 July 1928 – 30 September 2020), known professionally as Frank Windsor, was an English actor, primarily known for his roles on television, especially policeman John Watt in Z-Cars and its spin-offs.

Biography
Windsor attended Queen Mary's Grammar School, Walsall, and studied speech training and drama at the Central School of Speech and Drama, then based at the Royal Albert Hall, London. He played Detective Sergeant John Watt in Z-Cars from 1962 to 1965, and thereafter its spin-offs Softly, Softly (1966–1969), Softly, Softly: Taskforce (1969–1976), Jack the Ripper (1973), and Second Verdict (1976). He also returned as Watt for the final episode of Z-Cars itself in 1978.

He appeared as "Tobin" in Series 6, Episode 9 of The Avengers.

In 1969, he appeared in the pilot episode of Randall and Hopkirk (Deceased) in the episode "My Late Lamented Friend and Partner" as Sorrensen, a wealthy businessman with a murderous streak. His lighter side was demonstrated in the pilot episode of the situation comedy The Dustbinmen in 1968, and as Scoutfinder General in an episode of The Goodies.

From 1987 to 1989, he starred in the comedy drama Flying Lady written by Brian Finch. He also starred as a rather old-fashioned headmaster grappling with problems in education in Headmaster, which started as a single play in Play for Today in 1974. It was expanded into a six-part series in 1977.

He had regular roles in the BBC drama Casualty; the ITV drama Peak Practice; he played Major Charlie Grace in EastEnders (1992); appeared twice in Doctor Who; had various stage roles, and in his later years appeared in television commercials advertising life-assurance policies for people over 50. He was the subject of This Is Your Life on 3 December 1975 when he was surprised by Eamonn Andrews at the Metropolitan Police Sports Club in East Molesey.

He was married to Mary Corbett from October 1959 until his death. They had two children. Windsor died at his home in London in September 2020, at the age of 92.

Partial filmography

 This Sporting Life (1963) – Dentist
 The Jokers (1967) – Policeman in Court (uncredited)
 Spring and Port Wine (1969) – Ned Duckworth
 Dropout (1970)
 Sunday Bloody Sunday (1971) – Bill Hodson
 Assassin (1973) – John Stacy
 Barry McKenzie Holds His Own (1974) – Police Sergeant
 Leyland Cars – The Quality Connection (1975) – Police Officer/Commentator
 Who Is Killing the Great Chefs of Europe? (1978) – Blodgett
 The London Connection (1979) – McGuffin
 Dangerous Davies: The Last Detective (1981) – Fred Fennell
 Coming Out of the Ice (1982) – Sam Herman
 Doll's Eye (1982) – Restaurant Businessman
 Doctor Who – 4 episodes in 1983 and 1989
 The Shooting Party (1985) – Glass
 Revolution (1985) – Gen. Washington
 Out of Order (1987) – Traffic Warden
 All Creatures Great and Small (1989) – David Rayner in episode "Mending Fences"
 Lovejoy (1991) – Ralph Peagram in episode Raise the Hispanic
 EastEnders (1 episode in 1992) – Major Grace
 Midsomer Murders (1999) – George Meakham in S2:E2 "Strangler’s Woods"
 Between Two Women (2000) – Mr Walker (final film role)

References

External links
 
 

1928 births
2020 deaths
20th-century English male actors
21st-century English male actors
Alumni of the Royal Central School of Speech and Drama
English male film actors
English male stage actors
English male television actors
People educated at Queen Mary's Grammar School
People from Walsall
Actors from Staffordshire